Fred F. Haberlein was an American muralist, painter, and sculptor. He grew up at Conejos Ranch, a guest ranch in Conejos County, Colorado. He studied sculpture and printmaking in college, but he was best known for his murals throughout the western United States, predominantly in Colorado. He lived near Glenwood Springs, Colorado and died in 2018.

Haberlein was twice nominated for the Colorado Governor's Award for Excellence in the Arts. He taught art classes at Colorado Mountain College for eighteen years. His first mural was rendered in Oracle, AZ in 1977, and he completed over 130 murals since then. A Native American friend gave him the name "Lightning Heart," which he used professionally. Haberlein completed more single-handed murals than any other U.S. artist.

List of murals by location

Colorado

San Luis Valley

Alamosa

Antonito

La Jara

Manassa

Other

Glenwood Springs

Other

Outside Colorado, national and international

References

1944 births
American sculptors
20th-century American painters
American muralists
21st-century American painters
People from Conejos County, Colorado